A College of Respiratory Care is a type of educational institution, or part thereof, providing education and training to become a fully qualified respiratory practitioner. The nature of  respiratory care education and respiratory practitioner qualifications varies considerably across the world.

In Canada, "College of Respiratory Therapy" may refer to a provincial professional association, such as the College of Respiratory Therapists of Ontario.

Degrees granted
Associate of Science in Respiratory Care
Bachelor of Science in Respiratory Care
Master of Science in Respiratory Medicine

See also
National Board for Respiratory Care

References

Respiratory therapy